Calochilus metallicus, commonly known as the metallic beard orchid, is a species of orchid endemic to Tropical Queensland. It has a single dark green leaf and up to four pale green flowers with a pinkish or reddish "beard" on the labellum.

Description
The lateral sepals are a similar length but about narrower. Flowering occurs from December to February but each flower only lasts only a few hours.

Taxonomy and naming
Calochilus metallicus was first formally described in 2004 by David Jones and the description was published in The Orchadian from specimens collected near the Wenlock River. The specific epithet (metallicus) is derived from the Ancient Greek word metallon.

Distribution and habitat
The metallic beard orchid grows with grasses in low lying places on Cape York and on islands in the Torres Strait including Moa Island.

References

metallicus
Orchids of Queensland
Plants described in 2004